Kryptoperidiniaceae is a family of dinoflagellates belonging to the order Peridiniales.

Genera:
 Blixaea Gottschling
 Durinskia S.Carty & E.R.Cox
 Unruhdinium Gottschling

References

Dinophyceae
Dinoflagellate families